David Ostlund (born May 7, 1981) is an American professional strongman competitor. He grew up in Edina, Minnesota and attended Edina High School. Ostlund was a member of the Edina track and field team and competed in the shot put and discus events. It was his weight training for track that initially sparked his interest in the sport of strongman.

Ostlund began training with rocks and tires in addition to his weight training and in May 2001, he entered his first strongman contest in Lac du Flambeau, Wisconsin. He was placed first and has been competing regularly ever since.

Ostlund attended the University of St. Thomas in St. Paul, Minnesota where he continued his weight and strongman training. He graduated in 2003 and worked for about a year as a real estate appraiser. In 2004, he won his pro card at The Strongest in the West contest in Eagle, Idaho. In October 2005, he married Kate, whom he met at college. On March 9, 2009 Dave and Kate welcomed William Thor Ostlund into their family. They currently live in Edina, MN with William and a vizsla puppy named Mutsy. David lost in the 2020 seaweed war which took place in Northern Minnesota.

Achievements
Professional Competitive Record – [1st (6),2nd (5),3rd (3) – Out of Total(36)]

Performance Metric – .862 [American – .871 International – .854]

COMPLETED CONTESTS
 Rochester's Strongest Man 2010- Rochester, MN, USA- 1st Place
 World's Strongest Man 2008 – Charleston, West Virginia, USA – 3rd place
 World Strongman Federation Grand Prix – Belarus – Silichy, Belarus – 5th place (8/3/2008)
 Madison Square Garden Super Series (World's Strongest Man Qualifier) – New York, New York, USA – 3rd place (6/21/2008)
 Hawaii's Strongest Man – Honolulu, Hawaii, USA – winner (2008)
 All American Challenge / Fit Expo (World's Strongest Man Super Series Qualifier) – Los Angeles, California, USA – 3rd place (2/17/2008)
 USA vs Poland – Poland – 2nd place (2008)
 Mohegan Sun Super Series (World's Strongest Man Qualifier) – Connecticut, USA – 9th place (2008)
 World's Strongest Man – Anaheim, California, USA – 6th place (2007)
 Altona Strongman – Manitoba, Canada – winner (2007)
 World Strongman Cup – Moscow, Russia – 4th place (2007)
 Venice Beach Super Series (World's Strongest Man Qualifier) – Venice Beach, California, USA – winner (2007)
 St. Patrick's Strongman (National Qualifier) – Columbia, South Carolina, USA – 2nd place (2007)
 Fit Expo – Pasadena, California, USA – 4th place (2007)
 World Strongman Cup – Podolsk, Russia – 6th place (2006)
 World's Strongest Man – Sanya, China – 4th place in Heat, DNQ for Final (2006)
 Altona Strongman – Manitoba, Canada – winner (2006)
 Utah's Strongest Man (USA National Championship Qualifier) – Utah, USA – 7th place (6/10/2006)
 Mohegan Sun Super Series (World's Strongest Man Qualifier) – Connecticut, USA – 7th place (2006)
 World Strongman Cup – Riga, Latvia – 9th place (2006)
 Iron Man Fit Expo Strongman Championship – Pasadena, California, USA – 3rd place (2/19/2006)
 World Strongman Cup – Khanty Mansisk, Russia – 5th place (2006)
 World's Strongest Man – Chengdu, China – 9th place (2005)
 World Strongman Cup – Ladysmith, Canada – 4th place (2005)
 Big Tony's Strongman – Wisconsin, USA – 2nd place (2005)
 Mohegan Sun Super Series (World's Strongest Man Qualifier) – Connecticut, USA – 10th place (2005)
 Sweden Super Series (World's Strongest Man Qualifier) – Varberg, Sweden – 6th place (2005)
 Poland Super Series (World's Strongest Man Qualifier) – Malbork, Poland – 8th place (2005)
 USSF Russia Grand Prix – Moscow, Russia – 7th place (2005)
 Venice Beach Super Series (World's Strongest Man Qualifier) – Venice Beach, California, USA – 5th place (2005)
 Strongest Man on Grand – St. Paul, Minnesota, USA – 2nd place (2005)
 World Strongman Cup – Minsk, Belarus – 9th place (2005)
 USSF Ukraine Grand Prix – Kiev, Ukraine – 7th place (2005)
 Fit Expo – Pasadena, California, USA – 6th place (2005)
 Snowman Challenge – Illinois, USA 2nd place (2005)
 World Strongman Cup – Edmonton, Canada – winner (2004)
 Morden Strongman – Manitoba, Canada – winner (2004)
 Big Tony's Strongman – Wisconsin, USA – 4th place (2004)

Amateur Competitive Record – [1st (12),2nd (3),3rd (3) – Out of Total(21)]
Performance Metric – .947

 Strongest in the West (NAS) (Amateur Platinum Plus Level Competition) – winner (2004) earned ASC Professional Strongman Card
 NAS Team Championships – Illinois, USA – winner (2004)
 Snowman Challenge – Illinois, USA – winner (2004)
 Monster's of the Midwest (Amateur Platinum Level Competition) – Missouri, USA – 4th place (12/6/2003)
 USA Amateur National Championship – HW Division (Amateur Platinum Level Competition) – Myrtle Beach, South Carolina, USA – 3rd place (2003)
 Heartland Challenge – Iowa, USA – winner (2003)
 Dino Day Challenge – Columbus, Ohio, USA – winner (2003)
 Stillwater's Strongest Man – Minnesota, USA – 2nd place (2003)
 Granite City Strongman – Minnesota, USA – winner (2003)
 West Virginia's Strongest Man – West Virginia, USA – winner (2003)
 North Dakota's Strongest Man – North Dakota, USA – winner (2003)
 Battle of the Badge – Minnesota, USA – winner (2003)
 Azalea Festival Strongman – Virginia, USA – 2nd place (2003)
 Northeast Strongman Showdown – Boston, Massachusetts, USA – 2nd place (2003)
 Broadripple Fitness Strongman Challenge – Indianapolis, USA – winner (2003)
 USA Amateur National Championship – HW Division (Amateur Platinum Level Competition) – St. Louis, Missouri, USA – 6th place (2002)
 Heartland Challenge – Iowa, USA – 3rd place (2002)
 Stillwater's Strongest Man – Minnesota, USA – 7th place (2002)
 Granite City Strongman – Minnesota, USA – winner (2002)
 South Dakota's Strongest Man – South Dakota, USA – 3rd place (2001
 A & K Strongman Challenge – Wisconsin, USA – winner (2001)

References

External links
Official David Ostlund Web Site
David Ostlund Facebook

American powerlifters
American strength athletes
1970 births
Living people
People from Edina, Minnesota
Edina High School alumni
University of St. Thomas (Minnesota) alumni